Elmhurst is a small village in Curborough and Elmhurst civil parish within Lichfield District, in Staffordshire, England. It lies approximately 1.5 miles north of Lichfield.

The village is rural in nature, consisting of a few farms and a small number of private houses. It was once the site of Elmhurst Hall, a large country residence which hosted King Edward VII when he visited Lichfield for the centenary of the Staffordshire Yeomanry in 1894.

See also
 :Category:People from Elmhurst, Staffordshire

References

External links
 

Villages in Staffordshire
Lichfield District